= Kartikeya Ladha =

Indian author

- Born: Gwalior
- Writing career
- Years active: 2018–present

Kartikeya Ladha is an Indian author. Kartikeya published his first book ‘Dream Beyond Shadows’ in December 2018, which was based on his travels in Peru, South America. For his second book, Ladha took a 1100 km long walk from Kanyakumari to Goa, all by feet. Since his return to India from the U.S., he has also traveled around Northern, Central, Western and some of the Eastern regions of the country, in an attempt to learn more about himself and the country for bringing out a comprehensive set of creative writings based on his own experiences of traveling around the country. His work is a mix of philosophy, reflection on life and his travel experiences.

== Early life and career ==
Kartikeya was born in Gwalior. He moved to Boston, United States for higher studies and later worked in the solar industry in New York till early 2017. Ladha then decided to quit his job and travelled through Peru, South America. During his journey, he lived with tribals in Amazon jungle, and took upon odd jobs to keep travelling. This journey framed his first book. After coming back to India, he traveled around Ladakh studying Buddhism, and then later moved to Delhi for a job; only to quit his job again in 6 months. He then started traveling again and spent some time in the Himalayas, before getting his first book, ‘Dream Beyond Shadows’ published in December 2018. In January 2019 was when he walked through South India and made his way all the way till Goa looking for creative inspiration to write his next book.
